Evgenia Nikolayevna Ukolova (born 17 May 1989) is a Russian beach volleyball player. As of 2012, she plays with Ekaterina Khomyakova (also known by her married name of Ekaterina Birlova). They qualified for 2012 Summer Olympics in London and for the 2016 Summer Olympics in Rio de Janeiro.

At the 2012 Olympics, they qualified from their group but lost to the Chinese pair of Xue Chen and Zhang Xi in the first knockout round.

At the 2016 Olympics, they had to use the lucky loser route to qualify from the group stages, beating Barbora Hermannová and Markéta Sluková in the lucky loser round.  In the last 16, Ukolova and Birlova beat Elsa Baquerizo and Liliana Fernández of Spain, before losing to eventual silver medalists Ágatha Bednarczuk and Bárbara Seixas in the quarterfinals.

References

External links
 
 
 

1989 births
Living people
Russian beach volleyball players
Beach volleyball players at the 2012 Summer Olympics
Olympic beach volleyball players of Russia
Beach volleyball players at the 2016 Summer Olympics
Universiade medalists in beach volleyball
Sportspeople from Moscow
Universiade gold medalists for Russia
Medalists at the 2013 Summer Universiade